The Thor-Able was an American expendable launch system and sounding rocket used for a series of re-entry vehicle tests and satellite launches between 1958 and 1960. It was a two-stage rocket, consisting of a Thor IRBM as a first stage and a Vanguard-derived Able second stage. On some flights, an Altair solid rocket motor was added as a third stage. It was a member of the Thor family and an early predecessor of the Delta.

Launches
Sixteen Thor-Able were launched, nine on sub-orbital re-entry vehicle test flights and seven on orbital satellite launch attempts. Six launches resulted in failures, in which three of those failures were the result of an Altair upper stage added to the rocket to allow it to launch the spacecraft onto a trans-lunar trajectory. All sixteen launches occurred from Cape Canaveral Air Force Station Launch Complex 17A.

Airframes
The Thor-Able vehicle had a stronger airframe than the standard Thor IRBM and had the inertial guidance system replaced by a radio guidance package mounted on the Able stages. It saw its first test on 23 April 1958 when Vehicle 116 was launched from LC-17A with a biological nose cone containing a mouse named MIA (Mouse In Able). At 19:10 EST, the Thor's engine roared to life and drove the Able stage and its tiny passenger into the evening sky. Two minutes and fifteen seconds after launch, at an altitude of 50 miles (80 km), the Thor exploded and sent the hapless rodent into the Atlantic Ocean instead of space. The cause of the failure was traced to a turbopump bearing coming loose and resulting in pump shutdown and instant loss of thrust. With no attitude control, the Thor pitched down and its LOX tank ruptured from aerodynamic loads. On 9 July, Thor 118 lifted off for a second attempt with a mouse named MIA II. The booster, including the unproven Able stage, performed successfully and the biological nose cone was driven back into the atmosphere for a splashdown in the South Atlantic, but recovery crews failed to locate the capsule and it sank into the ocean. A third attempt was made on 23 July. The press refused to call the mouse by the name of MIA III, so she was instead christened "Wickie", after a local female news reporter who had covered the space program at Cape Canaveral. Unfortunately, Wickie was no luckier than her predecessors when recovery crews once again failed to locate the capsule after splashdown, but telemetry data confirmed the mouse's survival from liftoff through reentry and proved comprehensively that living organisms could survive space travel. Attention now turned to Thor-Able 127 and Pioneer 0, the world's first lunar probe. This flight took place on 17 August, but ended embarrassingly when the Thor exploded 77 seconds into the launch due to another turbopump malfunction. After an Atlas missile test a month later also failed due to the turbopumps, the Air Force Ballistic Missile Division quickly replaced the pumps in all of their missiles and this problem did not repeat itself again.

On 10 October, Pioneer 1 was launched on Thor 130. The second stage shut down too early and the probe did not have sufficient velocity to escape Earth's gravity. It re-entered the atmosphere and burned up 43 hours after launch.

Pioneer 2 was launched on 8 November and reentered the atmosphere less than an hour after launch when the third stage failed to ignite.

The next six Thor-Able flights were suborbital tests for the Air Force (23 January, 28 February, 21 March, 8 April, 20 May, and 11 June 1959). All of these were successful except the first one, which failed to stage due to an electrical problem and fell into the Atlantic Ocean.

On 7 August, Explorer 6 (a scientific satellite) was launched on Vehicle 134 and successfully orbited.

On 17 September, Transit 1A failed to orbit due to the third stage again failing to ignite.

On 3 November, Pioneer 5 was successfully launched. Intended originally as a Venus probe, technical delays caused it to be launched after the 1959 Venus window had closed so that it was instead sent into a heliocentric orbit.

The final Thor-Able launch orbited Tiros-1 on 1 April 1960.

The Able upper stage name represents its place as the first in the series, from the Joint Army/Navy Phonetic Alphabet.

See also
List of Thor and Delta launches (includes Thor-Able)
Thor (rocket family)

References

External links 
 Space Technology Laboratories Documents Archive

Thor (rocket family)